Malagueta pepper, a variety of Capsicum frutescens, is a type of chili pepper widely used in Brazil, the Caribbean, Portugal, Mozambique, Angola, and São Tomé and Príncipe. It got its name from the unrelated melegueta pepper, an African spice from Guinea which is a member of the ginger family.   

The malagueta pepper is a small, tapered chili that rates at about 5 cm (2 in) in length. It has a range of 60,000 to 100,000 Scoville units.

Nomenclature
They are not different varieties, just peppers of different maturities from the same plant. It is also known in Angola by the names of jindungo, ndongo, nedungo, and pripíri in various local languages.

History
The first Europeans to have contact with this species were the crew members who accompanied Christopher Columbus when they first landed in the Caribbean in 1492. In addition to being a noble delicacy much appreciated by the ancient inhabitants of the Americas, it was also used as a natural dye and, above all, as a medicine.

The spicy capsaicin content of the chilis must have aroused the interest of the Portuguese, who for decades have been looking for easier sources for the then-rare black pepper of Asia (the piquant compound in which is piperine); one of the major motivations for the Columbian voyages was to discover a new route to Asia for direct trade in spices, silks, and other Asian goods. At the time of Columbus's arrival in the New World, the Portuguese traded from the Gulf of Guinea a very popular African spice as a substitute for the black pepper: Aframomum melegueta (today in disuse in the West, but known as grains of paradise), which was then best known as melegueta pepper. Today, various botanical and culinary writers continue to confuse malagueta chilis and melegueta pepper.

Less than a century after being brought to Europe, chili pepper, because of its qualities, spread to many other Old World cultures, including Arabia, India, Thailand, China, and surrounding regions, integrating with local cuisines.

Uses

This pepper is used to season many regional dishes and sauces in Brazil and Mozambique. In Portugal, it is mainly used to season poultry dishes and traditional cooking.

In the cuisine of São Tomé and Príncipe, piri-piri sauce made with malagueta peppers is commonly available as a condiment in restaurants throughout São Tomé and Príncipe, as well as in Portugal.

In the Dominican Republic, malagueta with allspice to make a preparation called .

In the municipality of Borba, Amazonas, Brazil, the malagueta pepper is used to ward off the evil eye, which is rooted in feelings of envy.

See also
Piri Piri
Siling labuyo
Tabasco pepper
List of Capsicum cultivars

References

Portuguese cuisine
Spices
Chili peppers
Brazilian cuisine
Capsicum cultivars